Timeline of Augsburg, Bavaria, Germany.

Prior to 16th century

 14 BCE – Roman colony  established (approximate date).
 5th century CE – Settlement sacked by Huns.
 6th century CE - Catholic Diocese of Augsburg established.
 778 – Simpert becomes Bishop of Augsburg.
 788 – Town sacked by forces of Charlemagne.
 923 – Ulrich becomes Bishop of Augsburg.
 952 – Diet of Augsburg (meeting of leaders of Holy Roman Empire) active.
 989 – Perlachturm built.
 1065 – Augsburg Cathedral consecrated.
 1251 – Dominican Monastery of St. Katharine active.
 1276 – Augsburg becomes a Free Imperial City.
 1300 – Barfüsserkirche (church) founded.
 1321 – St. Anna-Kirche (church) founded.
 1364 – Three Moors Inn in business (approximate date).
 1370 - Public clock installed (approximate date).
 1407 - Paper mill established.
 1431 – Augsburg Cathedral remodeled.
 1468 - Burkhard Zingg writes Augsburger Chronik, a history of the city (approximate date).
 1472 – Printing press in operation.
 1487 - Fuggers Bank established.
 1493 – Artist Hans Holbein the Elder active (approximate date).
 1500 – Church of St. Ulrich and St. Afra built.

16th century
 1502 – Catholic Holy Cross Church built.
 1509 – Fortunatus (book) published.
 1515 – Dominikaner-Kirche (church) built.
 1517 - St. Anne's Church, Augsburg built.
 1518 - Fire engine built.
 1523 – Fuggerei residential area developed.
 1530 – Lutheran Confession of Augsburg introduced.
 1534 – Augsburg Protestant Cemetery established.
 1537
 Staats- und Stadtbibliothek Augsburg (city library) founded.
 Augsburg joins the Schmalkaldic League.
 1540 – Augsburger Börse (stock exchange) established.
 1546 – Maximilian Museum and Rotes Tor (gate) built.
 1573 - Sugar refinery begins operating.
 1577 – St. Ulrich's and St. Afra's Abbey active.
 1582 – St. Salvator Jesuit school founded.
 1594 – Augustusbrunnen (fountain) created for Maximiliansstrasse.
 1599 – Herkulesbrunnen (fountain) created for Maximiliansstrasse.

17th century
 1607 – Augsburger Zeughaus (armory) built.
 1609 - Metzg (butchers' house) built.
 1612 – Engravers Lucas Kilian and Wolfgang Kilian in business.
 1620 – Augsburg Town Hall built.
 1631 - Augsburg Art Cabinet sent to Sweden as a gift.
 1632 – Swedish Empire occupation begins.
 1635
 Swedish occupation ends.
 Population: 16,432.
 1650 – Augsburger Hohes Friedensfest (festival) begins.

18th century
 1703 – Town besieged by Bavarian forces.
 1712 – Academy of painting founded.
 1765 – Gignoux-Haus built.
 1770 – Ballroom built in the Schaezlerpalais.
 1782 – Dollische bookseller in business.
 1786 - Hot-air balloon flight of Joseph Maximilian Freiherr von Lütgendorf.

19th century
 1805 – 10 October: French in power.
 1806
 4 March: Augsburg becomes part of the Kingdom of Bavaria.
 Population: 26,200.
 1810 – Allgemeine Zeitung (newspaper) in publication.
 1817 – Augsburg becomes an administrative capital of the Oberdonaukreis.
 1825 – Chapel built in Protestant Cemetery.
 1833 – Holbein-Gymnasium (school) established.
 1837 – Town becomes administrative capital for the Swabia and Neuburg district.
 1840
 Sander'sche Maschinenfabrik in business.
 Cotton mill established.
 1846 – Augsburg Hauptbahnhof (train station) opens.
 1847
 Augsburg Morellstraße station opens.
 Turnverein Augsburg (sport club) formed.
 1854 – Maximilian Museum founded.
 1858 - Population: 43,616.
 1870 – Konigl. Industrieschule (industrial school) established.
 1875 – Paar Valley Railway begins operating.
 1876 – Der Volkswille newspaper in publication.
 1878
 Stadttheater Augsburg (theatre) built.
 Augsburger Eislaufverein (ice hockey team) formed.
 1885
 Stadtarchiv Augsburg (town archive) building established.
 Population: 65,905.
 1898 – Maschinenfabrik Augsburg-Nürnberg and Augsburg-Oberhausen Acetylene Factory in business.
 1900 – Population: 89,109.

20th century
 1903 – TSV Schwaben Augsburg (football club) formed.
 1905 - Population: 94,923.
 1907 – FC Augsburg (football club) formed.
 1910
 Landsberg Prison established in vicinity of Augsburg.
 Population: 102,487.
 1911 – Oberhausen becomes part of Augsburg.
 1917 - Augsburg Synagogue built.
 1919 - Population: 154,555.
 1920 – Stadtbücherei Augsburg (public library) founded.
 1924 – Augsburger Kajak Verein (kayak club) formed.
 1926 – Messerschmitt (aircraft works) in business.
 1930 - 8 September: Hitler gives speech, German federal election, 1930.
 1933 – Gau Swabia (Nazi administrative region) established.
 1937
 Augsburg Zoo opens.
 Mozarthaus (house museum) established.
 1938
 Messerschmitt aircraft manufactory in business.
 Ice skating rink opens.
 10 November: Synagogue destroyed during Kristallnacht.
 1942 – 17 April: Bombing by Allied forces.
 1944 – 25–26 February: Bombing by Allied forces.
 1945 – Schwäbische Landeszeitung newspaper begins publication.
 1948
 Weltbild (publisher) in business.
 Augsburger Puppenkiste (theatre) opens.
 1951
 Rosenaustadion (stadium) opens.
 Town art collections installed in the Schaezlerpalais.
 1954 - Fürst Fugger Privatbank established.
 1956 – United States military 11th Airborne Division stationed in Augsburg.
 1961 - Population: 208,659.
 1969 – Part of Göggingen becomes part of Augsburg.
 1970 – University of Augsburg founded.
 1971
 Augsburg Eiskanal (artificial whitewater river) opens.
 Augsburg University of Applied Sciences founded.
 1972
 Inningen becomes part of Augsburg.
 Kongresshalle opens.
 Dorint Hotel Tower built.
 1977
 Kulturhaus Kresslesmühle (cultural space) opens.
 Romanistentheater founded.
 1989 – Sparkassen-Planetarium opens.
 1996
 Kulturhaus Abraxas (cultural space) active.
 S’ensemble Theater founded.
 1998 – Brechthaus (museum) opens.

21st century

 2008 – Kurt Gribl becomes mayor.
 2009 –  (public library) building opens.
 2012 – Population: 272,699.

See also
 List of mayors of Augsburg

References

Bibliography

in English
published in the 17th-19th century
 
 
 
 
 
 
 
 Lewis, "The Roman Antiquities of Augsburg and Ratisbon", in volume xlviii, Archæological Journal, (London, 1891).

published in the 20th century
 

 
 
 
 

published in the 21st century

in German
 
 
 
 
 
 Werner, Geschichte der Stadt Augsburg, (Augsburg, 1900).

External links

 Europeana. Items related to Augsburg, various dates
 Digital Public Library of America. Items related to Augsburg, various dates

Years in Germany
 
Augsburg
augsburg